Alberton may refer to:

Australia

 Alberton, Queensland, a rural locality in the City of Gold Coast
 Alberton, South Australia
 Alberton, Tasmania
 Alberton, Victoria

Canada
 Alberton, Ontario
 Alberton, Prince Edward Island

New Zealand

 Alberton, Auckland, a colonial house in Mount Albert, Auckland, registered as a Category I heritage item with the New Zealand Historic Places Trust

South Africa

 Alberton, Gauteng

United States
 Alberton, Maryland
 Alberton, Montana